José Luis Molinuevo Martín (22 January 1917 – 24 December 2002) was a Spanish football manager and player.

He played for Athletic Bilbao (two spells), USAP Perpignan, SO Montpellier and RC Paris.

He coached Baskonia KK, CD Ourense, Sporting de Gijón, Pontevedra CF, Real Valladolid and CD Ensidesa.

References

External links

 

1917 births
2002 deaths
Spanish footballers
La Liga players
Montpellier HSC players
Racing Club de France Football players
Ligue 1 players
Spanish football managers
Sporting de Gijón managers
Real Valladolid managers
Pontevedra CF managers
Association football goalkeepers
CD Ensidesa managers
CD Basconia managers
Footballers from Bilbao